Butterfly bush may refer to a number of different plants including:

Buddleja
Buddleja davidii
Buddleja globosa
Rotheca myricoides, native to Africa

See also
Butterfly flower
Butterfly weed